The Song Celestial: A Poetic Version of the Bhagavad Gita is a translation of the Bhagavad Gita (a part of the Mahabharata) from Sanskrit into English by Sir Edwin Arnold, first published in 1885. The translation following The Light of Asia, his narrative-poem of the Lalitavistara Sūtra. It is dedicated to India with the following preface:

In his autobiography, Mahatma Gandhi recalled when two theosophist brothers gave him The Song Celestial during his studies in England. This was the first time Gandhi had ever read the Gita, as he had never read it in Sanskrit nor in Gujarati. Gandhi adored this version, stating: "I have read almost all English translations [...] and I regard Sir Edwin Arnold's as the best." Gandhi also invited Edwin Arnold to be the vice-president of the Vegetarian Society in London.

Summary
The book summarizes itself as the following: Krishna, who is regarded as an incarnation of the Divine, then instructs Arjuna on the way of duty and liberation through right action. The message he enunciates is applicable to people of all Faiths and all ages, for the battle to be fought, not only by mankind as a whole but for each individual, is the eternal one between right and wrong, between wisdom and ignorance, between the Self and not-Self.

Chapters
The chapters are listed as follows:

The Distress of Arjuna
The Book of Doctrines
Virtue in Works
The Religion of Knowledge
Religion of Renouncing Works
Religion of Self-Restraint
Religion by Discernment
Religion by Service of the Supreme
Religion by the Kingly Knowledge and the Kingly Mystery
Religion by the Heavenly Perfections
The Manifesting of the One and Manifold
Religion of Faith
Religion of Separation of Matter and Spirit
Religion of Separation of the Qualities
Religion by Attaining the Supreme
The Separateness of the Divine and Undivine
Religion by the Threefold Faith
Religion by Deliverance and Renunciation

See also
Bhagavad Gita
The Light of Asia

References

External links
 The Song Celestial, 1885

Bhagavad Gita
1885 books
Epic poems in English
Mahabharata
Kurukshetra
Krishna
Dialogues
Translations into English